Laxman or Laxmann is a Scandinavian surname. Notable persons with the name include:

 Adam Laxman, Finnish-Russian explorer and military officer, son of Erik
 Erik Laxmann, Finnish-Russian botanist, father of Adam.

Swedish-language surnames